Podmol (Подмол) is a village in the district of Prilep, in North Macedonia. It used to be part of the former municipality of Topolčani.

Demographics
According to the 2002 census, the village had a total of 138 inhabitants. Ethnic groups in the village include:

Macedonians 138

References

Villages in Prilep Municipality